Tangail Airport is an airstrip in Tangail city, Bangladesh. The airport was built in 1967 to serve Tangail District and other nearby districts, mainly for agricultural purposes. Several cargo airbuses were used in the 1970s to spread pesticides in local paddy fields. The airport has remained unmaintained since 1976 due to the local administration's negligence. Tangail airport has been used for Bangladesh Air Force training.

References

Defunct airports in Bangladesh
Airports in Bangladesh
Tangail District
Tangail City